Cerradomys vivoi is a species of rodent from South America in the genus Cerradomys. It occurs only in eastern Brazil, in the states of Bahia, Goiás, and Sergipe, and was formerly included in C. subflavus.

References
Percequillo, A.R., E. Hingst-Zaher, and C.R. Bonvicino. 2008. Systematic review of genus Cerradomys Weksler, Percequillo and Voss, 2006 (Rodentia: Cricetidae: Sigmodontinae: Oryzomyini), with description of two new species from Eastern Brazil. American Museum Novitates 3622: 1–46.

Mammals of Brazil
Cerradomys
Mammals described in 2008
Taxa named by Alexandre Reis Percequillo